Sulfobacillus acidophilus is a species of moderately thermophilic mineral-sulphide-oxidizing bacteria. It is Gram-positive, acidophilic and ferrous-iron-oxidising as well.

References

Further reading

External links

LPSN
Type strain of Sulfobacillus acidophilus at BacDive -  the Bacterial Diversity Metadatabase

Bacteria described in 1996